SKF-38,393 is a synthetic compound of the benzazepine chemical class which acts as a selective D1/D5 receptor partial agonist. It has stimulant and anorectic effects.

The trimethylation of SKF-38,393 leads to a named agent called Trepipam.

As with fenoldopam the inclusion of a chlorine halogen gave an agent that is called SKF-81,297.

References 

1-Phenyl-2,3,4,5-tetrahydro-1H-3-benzazepines
GSK plc brands
D1-receptor agonists
D5 receptor agonists
Catechols